Muping District, formerly also known as Ninghai or Ninghaichow, is a district administered by the prefecture-level city of Yantai, Shandong province, People's Republic of China, and is the easternmost county-level division of Yantai.

Administrative divisions
As 2012, this district is divided to 3 subdistricts and 10 towns.
Subdistricts
Ninghai Subdistrict
Wenhua Subdistrict
Yangmadao Subdistrict

Towns

References

Bibliography 

 
County-level divisions of Shandong
Yantai
Districts of China